The Devil Has a Name is a 2019 American dark comedy film starring and directed by Edward James Olmos. It also stars David Strathairn, Kate Bosworth, Pablo Schreiber, Katie Aselton, Haley Joel Osment, Alfred Molina, and Martin Sheen. The film premiered at the 2019 Los Angeles Latino International Film Festival. It was then released in the United States in selected theaters, through video on demand, and on digital platforms on October 16, 2020, by Momentum Pictures.

Plot
It is a fictionalized drama of true events surrounding California's Central Valley water contamination wars.

Cast
 David Strathairn as Fred Stern, a stubborn farmer whose farm gets poisoned by Gigi's company
 Edward James Olmos as Santiago, a Mexican immigrant and Fred's confidant
 Alfred Molina as Big Boss, a psychopathic CEO who wants to bring Gigi down
 Kate Bosworth as Gigi Cutler, an arrogant regional director of Shore Oil and Gas
 Martin Sheen as Ralph Wegis, an environmental lawyer who takes Fred's case
 Haley Joel Osment as Alex Gardner, a failing advertising agent who's recruited by Gigi
 Pablo Schreiber as Ezekiel, an ambitious yet cruel pyromaniac
 Katie Aselton as Olive Gore, Shore's high-powered, alcoholic lawyer
 Michael Hogan as Judge, known to Gigi as "Lance"

Filming
Principal photography started in Los Angeles in February 2018.

References

External links
 
 
 Film review, The Hollywood Reporter, August 5, 2019

2019 films
2019 black comedy films
2019 independent films
American black comedy films
American independent films
Films shot in Los Angeles
2010s English-language films
2010s American films